is a Japanese Shinto shrine near Hankyu Rokko Station in Nada-ku, Kobe. It is one of the biggest shrines in western Kobe along with the Sumiyoshi Shrine. It holds events on New Year's Day, the yakujin festival, setsubun and Shichi-Go-San. The big red torii gate at the entrance to the shopping mall is very large. It is at least 110 years old.

External links

 Official website

Shinto shrines in Hyōgo Prefecture
Hachiman shrines